Sex Machine Today is the 40th studio album by American musician James Brown. The album was released in May 1975, by Polydor Records.

Track listing

Personnel
James Brown - lead vocals, arrangements
Fred Wesley - production supervision, arrangements
Bob Both - production supervision, engineer
David Stone, Major Little - assistant engineer
Roger Huyssen - artwork

References

1975 albums
James Brown albums
Polydor Records albums